Eugene O'Neill (born 1978 in Cappawhite, County Tipperary) is an Irish sportsperson.  He plays hurling with his local club Cappawhite and played with the Tipperary senior inter-county team in the 1990s and 2000s.

References

Teams

1978 births
Living people
Cappawhite hurlers
Tipperary inter-county hurlers
All-Ireland Senior Hurling Championship winners